Earl Ernest Veron (January 2, 1922 – August 28, 1990) was a United States district judge of the United States District Court for the Western District of Louisiana.

Education and career

Born in Smoke Bend, Louisiana, Veron received a Bachelor of Arts degree from McNeese State University in 1957 and a Juris Doctor from the Paul M. Hebert Law Center at Louisiana State University in 1959. He was in private practice in Lake Charles, Louisiana from 1959 to 1968. He was a judge of the 14th Judiciary District in Lake Charles from 1967 to 1977.

Federal judicial service

On July 19, 1977, Veron was nominated by President Jimmy Carter to a seat on the United States District Court for the Western District of Louisiana vacated by Judge Edwin F. Hunter. Veron was confirmed by the United States Senate on August 4, 1977, and received his commission the following day. He assumed senior status due to a certified disability on February 13, 1990, serving in that capacity until his death.

Death

Veron died on August 28, 1990, of heart failure at the Tulane Medical Center in New Orleans, after collapsing earlier that day at the Federal Courthouse in New Orleans.

References

Sources
 

1922 births
1990 deaths
People from Ascension Parish, Louisiana
McNeese State University alumni
Louisiana State University Law Center alumni
Louisiana state court judges
Judges of the United States District Court for the Western District of Louisiana
United States district court judges appointed by Jimmy Carter
20th-century American judges
20th-century American lawyers